Horrocks is a lunar impact crater located entirely within the eroded northeast rim of the much larger walled plain Hipparchus. Its diameter is 30 km. It was named after the 17th-century English astronomer Jeremiah Horrocks. To the south of Horrocks are the craters Halley and Hind, Rhaeticus is to the north, and Pickering to the northeast. Gyldén and Saunder lie to the west and east, respectively.

The rim of Horrocks is somewhat irregular and polygonal, particularly with an outward  protrusion on the eastern rim. It has a small outer rampart. The inner wall is slumped, particularly along the northwest where it forms a heap of talus. The interior floor is uneven, and it has a central mountain and hills. The crater is approximately 30 kilometers in diameter and 3 kilometers deep. It is from the Eratosthenian period, which lasted from 3.2 to 1.1 billion years ago.

Satellite craters
By convention these features are identified on lunar maps by placing the letter on the side of the crater midpoint that is closest to Horrocks.

References

External links

Horrocks at The Moon Wiki
  
 
 

Impact craters on the Moon
Eratosthenian